Luna Plaza is a shopping center in Yilan City, Yilan County, Taiwan that opened in 2008. It is the largest shopping mall in the county as well as in eastern Taiwan.

Facilities
Luna Plaza is located in the commercial area under the detailed urban planning of the southern gate area of Yilan City. This is the commercial area land developed by the city rezoning process after the Former Yilan Prison in the of Yilan County Government was relocated. It is part of the South Gate Project and is part of the county government's overall old city regeneration cultural corridor (starting from Yilan railway station, extending from the Old City East Road and the Old City South Road to the Yilan River, forming a crescent-shaped corridor).

Luna Plaza was originally Carrefour’s first base in Yilan and was equipped with a community-based shopping mall. Later, it was transformed into a composite commercial building with various commercial facilities such as outlet stores, a five-star hotel, mass merchandisers, and cinemas, so that different consumers can meet their needs for sightseeing and local shopping at once. The 6th to 11th floors of the building house Silks Place Yilan（蘭城晶英酒店), a five-star hotel.

See also
 List of tourist attractions in Taiwan
 Urban Shopping Plaza

References

External links

Official website

2008 establishments in Taiwan
Shopping malls in Yilan City
Shopping malls established in 2008